Antonio Gabriel Maestrado La Viña (born October 22, 1959) is a Filipino lawyer, educator, and environmental policy expert. A former undersecretary of the Department of Environment and Natural Resources (DENR), executive director of the Manila Observatory, and dean of the Ateneo School of Government, he currently teaches law, governance, and philosophy in the Ateneo de Manila University, University of the Philippines, De La Salle University, Xavier University, San Beda University, Polytechnic University of the Philippines, Lyceum of the Philippines University, Pamantasang ng Lungsod ng Maynila (City University of Manila), Far Eastern University, Ateneo de Zamboanga, Liceo de Cagayan, and the Philippine Judicial Academy. In addition to these teaching responsibilities, La Viña is the director of the Energy Collaboratory of the Manila Observatory. He was also the chair (until June 2019) of the Partnership Council, Partnership for the Environmental Management of the Seas of East Asia. Likewise, he was chair of the Board of Trustees of the Forest Foundation of the Philippines until September 2020.

Education 

La Viña was born in Cagayan de Oro to lawyer and academic Gabriel La Viña and Mrs. Lourdes Chaves Maestrado-La Viña, who would later serve as city councilor for Cagayan de Oro, and is the daughter of Silvino Dacapio Maestrado, former Congressman for the 1st District of Misamis Province. He is the younger brother of former SSS Commissioner and DOT undersecretary Jose Gabriel "Pompee" La Viña.

He graduated from the Ateneo de Manila University in 1980 with a Bachelor of Arts degree in philosophy. After teaching philosophy at the Ateneo and Xavier University, he took up law at UP College of Law at the University of the Philippines Diliman. He would later place third in the 1989 Philippine Bar Examination (one of his schoolmates was former Philippine Defense Secretary and Congressman Gilbert Teodoro, who placed first in the bar that year). La Viña spent several years as a professor of law at UP in the 1990s, and as a human rights and environmental attorney serving indigenous peoples and other local communities.

From 1991 to 1995, La Viña attended Yale Law School in New Haven, Connecticut, for his Master of Laws and Doctor of Juridical Science degrees. At Yale, he focused on international environmental law and policy and wrote a dissertation on climate change. That dissertation was later published as a book (Climate Change and Developing Countries: Negotiating a Global Regime) by the Institute of International Legal Studies of the University of the Philippines Law Center.

Career 

While studying at the University of the Philippines College of Law, La Viña co-founded with Supreme Court Associate Justice Marvic Leonen, Dr. Gus Gatmaytan now of Ateneo de Davao University, and Atty Nonette Royo who is director of the International Land and Forest Tenure Facility based in Stockholm, Sweden, the Legal Rights and Natural Resources Center-Kasama sa Kalikasan (LRC), a human rights and environmental organization. He was LRC Director of Research and Development from 1987–91 and then from 1993–96.

In 1996, at the age of 36, he was appointed Undersecretary for Legal and Legislative Affairs of the Department of Environment and Natural Resources (DENR). As Undersecretary, his office emphasized the rights of indigenous peoples and local communities, efficient and fair access to justice in administrative decisions, public participation and stakeholder consensus building in environmental decision-making, and innovative programs in environmental regulation. Part of his duties included serving as the DENR's Crisis Manager, where he dealt with the department's response to, among others, the Marcopper mining disaster.

In addition, he was chief negotiator for the Philippines in the implementation of Conventions on Biological Diversity and Climate Change from 1996-1998, where he was recognized as the lead negotiator for developing countries in the negotiation of the Kyoto Protocol on Climate Change and the Cartagena Protocol on Biosafety. He served as Undersecretary until June 1998.

From 1998 to 2006, he was director of the Biological Resources Program and Senior Fellow in Institutions and Governance of the World Resources Institute in Washington D.C., with several offers for plum posts in international organizations.

In 2006, La Viña returned to the Philippines to accept an invitation to become dean of the Ateneo School of Government (ASoG), succeeding acting dean Antonette Palma-Angeles. With his administration, ASoG had emerged as a leading Philippine resource on environmental and climate change governance, being tapped by state, civil society, and international organizations for the design and implementation of local and national environmental policy (e.g., climate change adaptation and disaster risk reduction, REDD+). It has also gained recognition for advancing research, advocacies, and partnerships in social accountability, political reform, inclusive development and innovation, and social entrepreneurship.

In addition to these roles, he served as adviser to the Philippine delegation to the United Nations Framework Convention on Climate Change (UNFCCC), and Coordinator in 2011-2012 for the Group of 77 and China for the Ad Hoc Working Group on the Durban Platform for Enhanced Action on Climate Change. He served as a key facilitator for the Reducing Emissions from Deforestation and Degradation-Plus (REDD+) negotiations under the UNFCCC from 2009 to 2011. He was a lead negotiator and spokesperson of the Philippine delegation during the 2015 Paris climate negotiations.

La Viña's other current corporate and policy positions include:

 Member, Board of Trustees, Manila Observatory
 Member, Board of Trustees, Center for International Environmental Law (CIEL)
 Member, Board of Trustees, Southeast Asia Regional Initiatives for Community Empowerment (SEARICE)
 Previously, La Vina was a member of the Board of Trustees of Bioversity International (based in Rome, Italy) and Center for Forestry Research (CIFOR, based in Bogor, Indonesia). He was chair, Board of Trustees, Institute for Social Entrepreneurship in Asia (ISEA)

Authorship and Publication 

As an academician, lawyer, and environmental expert, La Viña has authored or edited numerous books, anthologies, monographs, and journal articles, mostly on environmental topics and issues. His experience in environmental issues has led him to author the chapter on environmental law and cases for the Benchbook for Philippine Trial Judges (Revised and Expanded); and Philippine Law and Ecology (Vol. 1: National Laws and Policies  and Vol. 2: International Treaties and Rules on Procedure), the last two of which are compilations of laws, international instruments, legal cases, and commentary on the constellation of Philippine environmental policy and jurisprudence.

He maintains a twice-weekly column, "Eagle Eyes", in the Manila Standard Today, and contributes to the Philippine social news site Rappler, where he comments on Philippine and international issues on the environment, socio-economic development, governance, and current affairs. He also maintains a column, "The Riverman's Vista" in the Mindanao current affairs news website MindaNews.

Personal life 

La Viña is married to Maria Carmen Bonto-La Viña, a psychotherapist. They have three sons.

Notes

References 

Ateneo de Manila University alumni
Academic staff of Ateneo de Manila University
Filipino educators
20th-century Filipino lawyers
Filipino environmentalists
University of the Philippines Diliman alumni
Yale Law School alumni
Living people
People from Cagayan de Oro
1959 births
Ramos administration personnel